Jonathan Ruque (born 22 May 2000) is a French professional footballer who plays as a right-back for Annecy.

Career
A youth product of Annecy since 2011, Ruque was promoted to their senior team in 2020. He helped the team come second in the 2021-22 Championnat National season and earn promotion into the Ligue 2. He debuted with Annecy in a 2–1 loss in the Ligue 2 to Niort on 30 July 2022.

References

External links
 
 FDB Profile

2000 births
Living people
Sportspeople from Annecy
French footballers
FC Annecy players
Ligue 2 players
Championnat National players
Association football fullbacks